Johan Wilhelm Zulch (2 January 1886 – 19 May 1924) was a South African international cricketer who played 16 Test matches for South Africa between 1910 and 1921.

Zulch was born in  Lydenburg, Transvaal. His cricket career was interrupted by World War I, but he still managed 985 Test runs at an average of 32.83, with two Test centuries — both against Australia on his first overseas tour in 1910–11.

His 105 came in the only Test South Africa won on that tour. Zulch batted for three hours, and a hundred from Tip Snooke then boosted South Africa to 482; and, despite 214 from Australian batsman Victor Trumper, and a relative failure from Zulch with 14 in the second innings, South Africa went on to win by 38 runs.

In the 2nd Test (1921) against Australia at Old Wanderers in Johannesburg, Australian fast bowler Ted McDonald dismissed Zulch by breaking his bat so that fragments flew back to dislodge a bail, and the Zulch was given out, "hit wicket".

He died in 1924, in Umkomaas, Natal, following a nervous breakdown.

Notes

External links
 

1886 births
1924 deaths
People from Lydenburg
Afrikaner people
South Africa Test cricketers
South African cricketers
Gauteng cricketers
H. D. G. Leveson Gower's XI cricketers